Juha Pekka Kaunismäki (born 6 May 1979 in Helsinki, Finland) is a Finnish-born Norwegian professional ice hockey defenceman, who currently plays with Stavanger Oilers of the Norway's elite GET-ligaen.

Career
Kaunismäki began playing in Finland with the Jokerit organization's junior teams. He later played for Kiekko-Vantaa of the third-level Suomi-sarja and the second-level Mestis. Kaunismäki played a total of five seasons in Mestis league, two with Kiekko-Vantaa and three with Ahmat Hyvinkää. In 2003 he joined Stavanger of the Norwegian league.

International career
Kaunismäki was selected to play for the Norway men's national ice hockey team at the 2010 Winter Olympics. He previously represented Norway at 2008 and 2009 World Ice Hockey Championships after changing his citizenship.

Career statistics

Regular season and playoffs

International

External links

1979 births
Living people
Finnish emigrants to Norway
Finnish ice hockey defencemen
Ice hockey players at the 2010 Winter Olympics
Jokerit players
Kiekko-Vantaa players
Norwegian ice hockey players
Olympic ice hockey players of Norway
Ice hockey people from Helsinki
Stavanger Oilers players